Danger Zone is a 1951 American film noir directed by William Berke.

Plot 
Claire Underwood hires San Francisco private eye Dennis O'Brien to purchase a saxophone case at a yacht party auction, but O'Brien is slugged and the case is stolen by Larry Dunlap. O'Brien snoops around and learns that Claire and Dunlap are rivals in a smuggling racket, and he seizes Claire just as she is about to leave the country with the case and its stolen jewels. He then gets involved with the murder of Vicki Jason's husband and gets slugged again and framed. With the aid of "Professor" Schickler, he proves his innocence when Vicki kills her coconspirator lover Edgar Spadely, another private detective, and Vicki admits her own guilt in the murder of her husband.

Cast

Production
The film was originally known as Roaring.

See also
Roaring City (1951)
Pier 23 (1951)

References

External links

1951 films
American thriller films
1950s English-language films
Films directed by William A. Berke
1950s thriller films
Lippert Pictures films
American black-and-white films
1950s American films